Chapter 7: Executive Government.  Chapter 7 of the 1997 Constitution is titled Executive Government.  There are five Parts, further subdivided into thirty sections, which set out the organization, functions, and responsibilities of the executive branch of government.  Modeled on the Westminster system, Fiji's constitution does not separate the Executive  and Legislative branches of government as strictly as do many democracies, but despite considerable overlap, the branches of government are nevertheless constitutionally distinct.

Part 1 Executive Authority

Part 1 of Chapter 7, comprising Sections 85 through 88, establishes the offices of President and Vice-President and briefly summarizes their functions and responsibilities, on which the remainder of the chapter elaborates.

Sections 85 through 87 declare the President to be Fiji's Head of State, in whom executive authority is "vested."  Later sections reveal this authority to be largely, though not entirely, symbolic.  The President is further declared to be the symbol of the unity of the State, and the Commander-in-Chief of the military forces.

Section 88 establishes the office of Vice-President, who is empowered to take over the functions of the President in the event of the President being absent or otherwise unable to carry out his duties.  If the President and Vice-President are both unable to perform Presidential duties, the Speaker of the House of Representatives may carry out the necessary functions.

In the event of the death, resignation, or incapacitation of the President, a new President and Vice-President must be appointed within three months.  The Vice-President is authorized to exercise the functions of the presidency while the office is vacant.  The Vice-President may be a candidate to fill the vacancy, but does not automatically succeed to it.  This stipulation is designed to remove any vested interest a disloyal Vice-President might potentially have of producing a vacancy in the Presidency.

In practice, on the two occasions that the Presidency has fallen vacant (as of September 2004), the Vice-President has, after performing the President's functions in an interim capacity, been duly appointed to fill the vacancy.  Ratu Sir Penaia Ganilau died in 1993 and was succeeded by his Vice-President, Ratu Sir Kamisese Mara.  Mara was deposed in the Fiji coup of 2000, but after the Constitution was restored and Mara declined reappointment, his Vice-President, Josefa Iloilo was appointed to succeed him.

Part 2 President and Vice-President

Part 2 of Chapter 7, comprising Sections 89 through 95, sets out the qualifications, manner of election, and formula for removal of the President and Vice-President, and miscellaneous rules relating to the institution of the two offices.

Sections 89 through 91 stipulate that the President and Vice-President shall be appointed by the Great Council of Chiefs "after consultation with the Prime Minister."  It is not clear whether or not this clause gives the Prime Minister a veto.  It has never been tested.

The President and Vice-President are required to be Fijian citizens who have had a distinguished career in any aspect of national or international life, whether in the public or private sectors, and must meet the qualifications required of candidates for the House of Representatives.  The offices of President and Vice-President are incompatible with any other offices; appointment to either position automatically terminates one's service in whatever other office he or she might be serving in at the time.  The term of office is five years, renewable once.

Section 92 provides for the replacement of the Vice-President in the event of the office becoming vacant.  The President nominates another person to complete the unexpired term of the Vice-President, subject to the approval of the Great Council of Chiefs.

Section 93 authorizes the Great Council of Chiefs to remove the President or Vice-President from office for "infirmity of body or mind... or for misbehaviour."  This is not an easy process, however.  First, the Prime Minister must notify the Chief Justice that he considers the President or Vice-President unable to carry out his duties or unfit to remain in office.  In the event of alleged physical or mental infirmity, the Chief Justice is required to establish a medical board consisting of three qualified medical practitioners; in the event of alleged treason, felony, bribery, or other misbehaviour, a tribunal of three persons, each of whom is eligible to be a judge, is to be appointed.  After makings thorough investigation, the medical board or tribunal is to present its findings to the Great Council of Chiefs, whose decision is final.

Section 94 requires that the President and Vice-President must take the Oath of Allegiance and the oaths relating to their respective offices; these are set out later in the Constitution.  The oaths are to be administered by the Chief Justice.

The authorizing of only one person (namely, the Chief Justice) is designed to forestall legal recognition of any Presidential or Vice-Presidential oath administered illegally, as happened in the 2000 coup, when Ratu Jope Seniloli (an accomplice of the coup's chief instigator, George Speight) was administered the Presidential oath of office by someone other than the Chief Justice.  On 6 August 2004, he was convicted of treason for swearing an unconstitutional oath.

Section 96 allows the Parliament to make laws, subject to the Constitution, "relating to the appointment, the terms and conditions of office, including pension entitlements, and the procedures for removal, of the President and Vice-President."

Part 3 Cabinet Government
.

Part 3 of Chapter 7, comprising Sections 97 through 109, establishes the Cabinet as the effective government of Fiji.  This follows Westminster practice: in the Cabinet, collectively, makes executive decisions and its members exercise executive authority in the name of the President.

Section 96 curtails the power of the President to act independently.  In the exercise of powers, the President is to act "only on the advice of the Cabinet or a Minister or of some other body or authority prescribed by this Constitution."  The Constitution does, however, go on to specify a few carefully defined exceptions to this rule.

Sections 97 through 99 declare that governments (namely, Cabinets) must have the confidence of the House of Representatives.  The appointment of the Prime Minister is one of the few areas in which the President is authorized to exercise "his or her own judgement".  This is immediately qualified, however: the person the President chooses must be "the member of the House of Representatives who, in the President's opinion, can form a government that has the confidence of the House of Representatives."  Significantly, the clause states, not "a" member but "the" member, therefore assuming that in the normal course of events, there will be only one such candidate.  In the Westminster model, this is assumed to be the leader of the political party or coalition holding a majority of seats in the House of Representatives.  In cases where no legislative majority exists, however, due to party splits (as happened in 1992) or to electoral fragmentation, the President must exercise personal discretion and appoint as Prime Minister the person he or she considers most likely hold the confidence of the House of Representatives.

The Cabinet, whose members must also be members of either the House of Representatives or the Senate, is to be appointed by the President on the advice of the Prime Minister.  The Cabinet must reflect the composition of the House of Representatives: every political party with eight or more seats in the House is entitled, if willing, to a proportionate number of positions in the Cabinet.  If the Prime Minister wishes to include ministers from a political party or parties holding fewer than eight seats, the appointments must be at the expense of his own party, not other parties entitled to cabinet representation.  In selecting minister from political parties other than his own, the Prime Minister is to consult with the leaders of those parties.

The provision for a multiparty cabinet was a departure from the usual Westminster model, which Fiji had previously followed.  As political parties in Fiji have in practice represented mostly ethnic rather than ideological interests, elections tended to result in a government with little representation from outside of its ethnic power base.  The Mara government (1967-1987) was supported mostly by ethnic Fijians and minority groups, but never succeeded in attracting more than a quarter of the Indo-Fijian vote.  The Bavadra government, which took office following the 1987 election, was supported by no more than 9% of the ethnic Fijian electorate, although Prime Minister Bavadra was himself an ethnic Fijian.  Cabinets, always drawn from the caucus of the governing party, therefore tended to be ethnically lopsided, which aroused resentment among the ethnic groups that were underrepresented.  This was a leading factor in the 1987 coup: the election of the Bavadra government, which included only four ethnic Fijian ministers, had provoked a month of increasingly disorderly protests which culminated in the coup led by Lieutenant Colonel Sitiveni Rabuka.  The 1997 constitutional convention decided that a multiparty cabinet would be the best way of ensuring representation of all ethnic communities, as well as of encouraging cooperation among their leaders.  The concept of a Consociational state was regarded as the ideal to work for.

The constitutional convention that decided on the multiparty cabinet model coincided with a similar series of negotiations that were taking place in Northern Ireland, which culminated in the Good Friday Agreement providing, among other things, for a power-sharing Executive in which all significant willing parties were to be represented, in order to ensure the representation at Executive level of Catholic, as well as Protestant, parties.  Fiji's decision to follow a similar course was another reflection of its faith in British constitutional models: while the standard Westminster cabinet model was rejected as unsuited to local conditions, alternative models rooted in British practice were studied, and one was adopted.

In practice, this constitutional requirement for a multiparty cabinet has never been strictly observed.  After the 1999 election, Prime Minister Mahendra Chaudhry refused to include his defeated foes, the Soqosoqo ni Vakavulewa ni Taukei, in his Cabinet, despite its holding of eight seats in the House of Representatives.  Following the 2001 election, Prime Minister Laisenia Qarase found pretexts for excluding the Labour Party from the Cabinet, even though it had won 28 seats, almost four times more than the constitutional requirement for automatic inclusion in the Cabinet.  Court cases followed, and on 18 July 2003, the Supreme Court ruled that the exclusion of the Labour Party was unconstitutional and demanded that the situation be rectified.  Negotiations, appeals, and counter-appeals stalled the resolution of the dispute, and a subsequent Supreme Court ruling in June 2004 held that the Labour Party was entitled to 14 out of 30 cabinet positions.  Qarase announced that he would abide by the verdict, but his continuing refusal to include Chaudhry himself in the Cabinet has prolonged the dispute.  As of September 2004, the matter is far from resolved.

Section 100 establishes the office of the Attorney-General, who is the chief legal adviser to the government.  Although a member of the Cabinet, the Attorney-General's office is the only Cabinet position, apart from that of the Prime Minister, to be mentioned specifically in the Constitution.  This position differs from other Cabinet posts in several important ways.  Unlike other Cabinet ministers, who are not required to have any particular educational qualifications, the Attorney-General, or any person acting in that capacity, must be a barrister and solicitor qualified and registered to practice law in Fiji.  The Attorney-General is also the only member of the Cabinet who, although a member of one house of Parliament, may attend and participate in the proceedings of (but not vote in) the other house.  In the event of the Attorney-General's absence, their responsibilities may be taken over by another minister or member of Parliament, who must meet the qualifications for Attorney-General, or by the Solicitor-General.

Sections 101 through 106 set out the responsibilities and functions of Cabinet ministers.  Ministers may have whatever functions, titles, and responsibilities the Prime Minister may determine, and are responsible for one or more branches of government.  Any part of government business not specifically assigned to a particular minister is the responsibility of the Prime Minister.  All ministers are individually and collectively responsible to, and must hold the confidence of, the House of Representatives.

A Minister must take the Oath of Allegiance and the oath of office, set out in a later section of the constitution, before the President.  The taking of such an oath before anyone other than the lawful President, or someone authorized to act on his behalf, constitutes an act of treason, and on 6 August 2004 several defendants, including Ratu Rakuita Vakalalabure (the current Deputy Speaker of the House of Representatives), were convicted of treason for having taken an illegal oath of office during the 2000 coup.  (They had been sworn in by Ratu Seniloli).

Section 104 requires the Prime Minister to keep the President "generally informed about issues relating to the governance of Fiji."  In addition, the Prime Minister must supply whatever specific information the President may ask for.

Section 105 specifies the circumstances in which a minister may leave office.  Except in the case of the expiry or dissolution of the House of Representatives, in which case all ministers remain in office pending the appointment of a new cabinet, a minister may leave office by resignation either from the office itself or from the Parliament, membership of which is a prerequisite for membership of the Cabinet.  In the event of the dismissal or resignation of the Prime Minister, the tenure of all other ministers is automatically terminated.

Section 106 provides for the appointment of "Acting Ministers" to take over the functions of any minister on an interim basis, in the event of the minister being unable to carry out their duties on account of sickness, absence from Fiji, or any other case.  The appointment of an Acting Minister must be published in the government's official Gazette.

Sections 107 through 109 specify the rules for the transfer of authority from one government to another, for the organizing of premature parliamentary elections, and for dismissal of a Prime Minister.  If the government is defeated in a general election, the Prime Minister must resign.  If the government is defeated in a vote of no confidence in the House of Representatives (as happened in 1994), or if the House rejects "A bill appropriating revenue or moneys for the ordinary services of the Government," the Prime Minister must advise the President on whether there is another person who can command a legislative majority, and if so, resign in that person's favour.

Alternatively, the Prime Minister may advise the President to dissolve the House of Representatives and order a premature election.  The President must first ascertain whether there is in fact no person able to hold the confidence of the incumbent House of Representatives, and may grant the Prime Minister's request for a dissolution only if no such person is found.  Otherwise, the President is to dismiss the Prime Minister and appoint the alternate Prime Minister.  If the latter subsequently fails to win a vote of confidence in the House, "the President must dismiss him or her, re-appoint the predecessor and grant that person the dissolution originally advised."

The President is not allowed to dismiss the Prime Minister except in the event the failure of the government to win a vote of confidence in the House of Representatives.  The Constitution is silent on the matter of what should be done in the event of the Prime Minister being unable to perform their duties.  This happened during the 2000 coup, when Prime Minister Mahendra Chaudhry was kidnapped and held hostage by gunmen working for the chief insurrectionist, George Speight.  In captivity, Chaudhry was unable to carry out his duty of rendering the President advice, without which the President could not lawfully assume the emergency powers he believed he needed to deal with the crisis.  Faced with a constitutional dilemma, President Mara dismissed Chaudhry and appointed Ratu Tevita Momoedonu, who rendered the necessary advice and then immediately resigned.  Whether or not Mara's move was constitutionally allowable is open to debate.  Revisions to the constitution are underway to clarify such ambiguities.

Part 4 Government Administration

Part 4 of Chapter 7, comprising Sections 110 through 114, deals with the organization of the civil, police, and military forces of Fiji.

Section 110 stipulates that every department of government shall have a permanent head, who may be styled Permanent Secretary, Secretary, Head of Department, or other appropriate title.  By default the head of a department shall be called Secretary, unless another title is specifically chosen.  The Secretary is responsible to the Minister in charge of the department.

This follows British, as distinct from American, practice.  In the United States, the head of each department is a member of the President of the United States's Cabinet.  British practice, on the other hand, is to keep the civil service separate from, but responsible to, political authority.  While the Minister to whom each government department is ultimately responsible is an elected politician subject to replacement at any time, day-to-day administration of the department is in the hands of the Secretary who holds the office more or less permanently.

In this section, the term "department" specifically excludes the police and the military.

Section 111 establishes the office of Commissioner of Police.  This official is appointed by the Constitutional Offices Commission, following consultation with the appropriate Cabinet Minister.  The Commissioner of Police holds executive and administrative authority over the entire police force, and is answerable only to the Minister in charge.  Parliament may, however, make laws regulating the police force.

Section 112 outlines the organization of the Military of Fiji, called the Republic of Fiji Military Forces.   The President, on the advice of the appropriate Minister, appoints a Commander of the Republic of Fiji Military Forces, who is answerable to the said Minister.  The Commander is responsible for all appointments, promotions, and demotions in the armed forces, and for all disciplinary action (including expulsion) against servicemen.  In addition, Parliament may regulate the military in other ways.

Sections 113 and 114 establish the offices of Solicitor-General and Director of Public Prosecutions.  Both must meet the qualifications required of judges.  The Solicitor-General is appointed by the Judicial Service Commission following consultation with the Attorney-General.  As specified elsewhere in this chapter, the Solicitor-General may exercise the functions of the Attorney-General in their absence.   The Director of Public Prosecutions is appointed by the Constitutional Offices Commission following consultation with the Attorney-General.  This official may order criminal charges to be brought against individuals and corporate entities, take over criminal proceedings instituted by another person or authority, or dismiss any charges before a judicial verdict has been rendered.

Charges brought before military courts are specifically excluded from the authority of the Director of Public Prosecutions.

Part 5 Prerogative of Mercy

Part 5 of Chapter 7, comprises a single section:  Sections 115.   Titled Prerogative of Mercy, it authorizes the President to issue full pardons and conditional pardons to persons convicted of any legal offence, to remit all or part of any penalty imposed, or to "grant... a respite, either indefinitely or for a specified period, of the execution of the punishment imposed for the offence."  This power is not to be exercised independently but only on the advice of the Commission on the Prerogative of Mercy.  This commission consists of three persons: its chairman, the Attorney-General, and two other persons appointed by the President "acting in his or her own judgement."  The appointment of this commission is one of the few aspects of government in which the President has a free hand.  If a person has been sentenced to death in a civilian court, the commission must consider a report on the case written by the judge who presided at the trial, or, in the event of absence of that judge, by the Chief Justice.  The commission must also take into account any other relevant facts derived from the record of the case, or from any sources to which the commission has access, before advising the President on whether or not to exercise the Prerogative of Mercy.

The Prerogative of Mercy was exercised by President Ratu Josefa Iloilo in 2001, when he commuted to life imprisonment the death sentence imposed on George Speight, who was convicted of treason for his leading role in the 2000 coup.

1997 Constitution of Fiji